

Buildings and structures

Buildings

 1531 – Kõpu Lighthouse on Hiiumaa begins operation.
 1532–1536
 Rood screen in King's College Chapel, Cambridge in England is erected.
 Palazzo Massimo alle Colonne in Rome, designed by Baldassare Peruzzi, is built.
 c. 1532–1537 – Palazzo Massimo di Pirro in Rome, designed by Giovanni Mangone, is built.
 1532
 Church of the Ascension (the "White Column") at Kolomenskoye, near Moscow, is built.
 Church of the Royal Monastery of Brou in France (begun 1506) is completed.
 1533 – Work begins on La Fortaleza in Puerto Rico.
 1534 – Regensburg Cathedral in Germany is completed after 259 years of work.
 c. 1535–1537 – Casa Aliaga in Lima (Ciudad de los Reyes), Peru, is built.
 1535 – After 258 years of work since 1277, St Alphege Church in Solihull, England, is completed.
 1537 – Work begins on the Biblioteca Marciana in Venice, designed by Jacopo Sansovino.
 1538 – Work begins on
 Nonsuch Palace in Surrey, England.
 The Piazza del Campidoglio on the Capitoline Hill in Rome, designed by Michelangelo. Pope Paul III moves the Equestrian Statue of Marcus Aurelius to the Capitoline Hill.
 Adding bastions to the city walls of Nuremberg, to the design of Maltese military engineer Antonio Falzon.
 1539 – Work begins on the first batch of Device Forts on the coast of England, including Cowes Castle on the Isle of Wight.

Events
 1537 – Sebastiano Serlio publishes the first volume of his architectural treatise, Tutte l'opere d'archittura et prospetiva, in Venice, putting the classical orders into canonical form.

Births
 1530 – Juan de Herrera, Spanish architect (died 1593)
 c. 1531 – Bernardo Buontalenti, Florentine architect, stage designer, military engineer and artist (died 1608)
 1533 – Giovanni Antonio Dosio, Italian architect and sculptor (died 1609)
 1535
 Early? - Robert Smythson, English architect (died 1614)
 June 18 – Jakub Krčín, Czech architect (died 1604)
 c. 1536 – Ottaviano Nonni, Bolognese architect, sculptor and painter working in Rome (died 1606)
 1538 – Pablo de Céspedes, Spanish painter, poet and architect (died 1608)

Deaths
 1530: Approximate date – Bramantino, Milanese painter and architect (born c.1456)
 1532 – Andrea Riccio, Italian sculptor and architect (born c.1470)
 1534: December 27 – Antonio da Sangallo the Elder, Florentine architect (born 1453)
 1537: January 6 – Baldassare Peruzzi, Sienese architect and painter working in Rome (born 1481)
 1539 – Marco Palmezzano, Italian painter and architect from Forli (born 1460)

References

Architecture